Irēna Žauna (born 16 March 1981) is a Latvian hurdler. She competed in the women's 400 metres hurdles at the 2000 Summer Olympics.

References

1981 births
Living people
Athletes (track and field) at the 2000 Summer Olympics
Latvian female hurdlers
Olympic athletes of Latvia